Wang Hsiang-huei (born 28 September 1987) is a Taiwanese footballer who plays as a midfielder for Taiwan Mulan Football League club Hualien FC, where she serves as its captain, and the Chinese Taipei women's national team.

International goals

References

1987 births
Living people
Women's association football midfielders
Taiwanese women's footballers
Footballers from Taichung
Chinese Taipei women's international footballers
Asian Games competitors for Chinese Taipei
Footballers at the 2006 Asian Games
Footballers at the 2014 Asian Games
Footballers at the 2018 Asian Games